Maíz is a Mexican restaurant and nixtamaleria at Seattle's Pike Place Market, in the U.S. state of Washington. Sibling restaurant Maíz Molino opened in Denny Triangle in 2022.

Description 

Maíz is a restaurant at Pike Place Market serving nixtamal tortillas and antojitos (Mexican street food) including chalupas, gorditas, huaraches, quesadillas, sopes, guisado-style tacos, tamales, tlacoyos, and tostadas. The menu has also included chilaquiles, pan dulce, champurrado, horchata lattes, and other Mexican-style coffee drinks. In addition to chilaquiles, the restaurant's breakfast menu was expanded in August 2022 to include egg tacos and fruit with chamoy and Tajín.

The interior features white tile walls, mosaics of corn and the restaurant's name, and talavera tiles depicting skeletons bathing, riding motorcycles, texting, and doing yoga. Naomi Tomky of the Seattle Post-Intelligencer said the shop is "a modern feeling space that celebrates an ancient tradition". The interior also has four stools for indoor dining.

History 
Aldo Góngora opened the brick and mortar restaurant in a former Mexican grocery store on November 2, 2021, with a ribbon cutting ceremony and Day of the Dead celebration featuring a live mariachi band. The tortilla shop is the second in Seattle nixtamalizing its own corn, following Milpa Masa.

"Sibling" restaurant Maíz Molino opened in Denny Triangle in 2022.

Reception 
In 2022, Allecia Vermillion included Maíz in Seattle Metropolitans list of best new restaurants. She also included the business in a 2022 overview of "Seattle's great tacos and Mexican restaurants".

See also

 List of Mexican restaurants

References

External links 

 
 Maíz at Pike Place Market

Central Waterfront, Seattle
Mexican restaurants in Seattle
Pike Place Market